The Pencak silat competition at the 2009 Asian Martial Arts Games took place from 3 August to 7 August at the Chaofah Mahachakree Sirinthorn Gymnasium at Sports School Suphan Buri Province in Suphan Buri.

Medalists

Men

Women

Medal table

Results

Men

50 kg

55 kg

60 kg

65 kg

70 kg

75 kg

Women

50 kg

55 kg

60 kg

65 kg

70 kg

References
 Official website – Pencak Silat

2009 Asian Martial Arts Games events